Behind The Player: John 5 is an Interactive Music Video featuring Rob Zombie guitarist John 5. Released on November 1, 2008 by IMV, the DVD features John 5 giving in-depth guitar lessons for how to play "Let It All Bleed Out" and "The Lords of Salem" by Rob Zombie and an intimate behind-the scenes look at his life as a professional musician, including rare photos and video.  The DVD also includes John 5 playing "The Lords of Salem" with Rob Zombie drummer Tommy Clufetos.

References

External links
 Official website

Behind the Player
2008 video albums